João Mário Ferreira Oliveira (born 28 December 1966), known as João Mário, is a former Portuguese football player.

He played 9 seasons and 199 games in the Primeira Liga for Braga, Tirsense and Famalicão.

Club career
He made his Primeira Liga debut for Braga on 29 August 1987 as a starter in a 0–0 draw against Salgueiros.

Personal
His son João Cunha is a professional footballer.

References

1966 births
Footballers from Porto
Living people
Portuguese footballers
F.C. Paços de Ferreira players
S.C. Braga players
F.C. Tirsense players
F.C. Famalicão players
S.C. Beira-Mar players
Liga Portugal 2 players
Moreirense F.C. players
Gondomar S.C. players
U.S.C. Paredes players
Association football midfielders
Sheffield Wednesday F.C. non-playing staff 
Swansea City A.F.C. non-playing staff